Eric Reynolds is a visual effects supervisor. Reynolds and his fellow visual effects artists are nominated for an Academy Award for Best Visual Effects for the 2013 film The Hobbit: The Desolation of Smaug.

References

External links

Visual effects supervisors
Living people
Year of birth missing (living people)